Andrea Borg (born 12 November 1999) is a Maltese footballer who plays as a midfielder or a forward for SHU Pirates. Borg was born in Malta and raised in Dubai, but is a youth international for Malta.

Club career
On 10 April 2016, Borg joined League One side Peterborough United after a spell in Dubai with IJF Academy. On 25 March 2017, Borg was an unused substitute during Peterborough's 1–0 away victory against Gillingham. On 14 April 2017, Borg made his debut for Peterborough, in their 2–1 home defeat against Fleetwood Town, featuring for 82 minutes before being replaced by Paul Taylor. He made his FA Cup debut on 27 January 2018, coming on as a second half substitute in their defeat to Leicester City.

On 10 August 2018, Borg joined Southern League Premier side Kettering Town on loan until January. In November, he was recalled from his loan after making 18 appearances at Kettering.

Career statistics

References

1999 births
Living people
Sportspeople from Dubai
Maltese footballers
Malta youth international footballers
Association football midfielders
Peterborough United F.C. players
English Football League players
Maltese expatriate sportspeople in the United Arab Emirates
Maltese expatriate footballers
Maltese expatriate sportspeople in England
Expatriate footballers in England
Kettering Town F.C. players
Seton Hall Pirates men's soccer players